The  is a railway company in Iwate Prefecture in northern Japan. The company was founded in 1981, as the first "third sector" (half public, half private) railway line in the country, excluding special cases such as freight railways in seaports. Its lines are former Japanese National Railways (JNR) lines, that were going to be closed. Santetsu acquired these lines in 1984. The company also operates a travel agency and other businesses.

Lines
  Rias Line (リアス線) (163.0 km,  - )

Rias Line

Station list

History

Kita-Rias Line
The Japanese National Railways (JNR) opened the Miyako to Taro section in 1972 and the Kuji to Fudai section in 1975. It constructed the Taro to Fudai section, and transferred the entire line to Sanriku on the day it opened in 1984. The line features 42 tunnels, including the Masaki (6,532 m) and Omoto (5,174 m) tunnels, both opened in 1984.

Minami-Rias Line
JNR opened the Sakari to Ryori section in 1970, extending the line to Yoshihama in 1973. It constructed the section to Kamaishi and transferred the entire line to Sanriku on the day it opened in 1984. The line features 20 tunnels.

2011 earthquake and tsunami damage
Both lines were heavily damaged by the 2011 Tōhoku earthquake and tsunami. The two lines suffered damage at 300 locations, including damage to station buildings and bridges. The tsunami washed away 5.8 km of railway tracks on the lines. Full restoration of service on the lines was completed in April 2014.

Diesel railcars damaged by the earthquake and tsunami were replaced by three new diesel railcars funded by Kuwait. The new cars were introduced in January 2014.

The two sections of the Sanriku Railway were for a long time separated by a destroyed segment of the Yamada Line.

On 23 March 2019, the Yamada Line section from Miyako to Kamaishi was reopened and transferred to Sanriku Railway.
This joined up with the Kita-Rias Line on one side and the Minami-Rias Line on the other, which together constitutes the entire Rias Line restored. The result is a resumption of continuous rail service between Kuji and Sakari Station where it links with the Ōfunato Line.

Typhoon Hagibis damage

Following the Typhoon Hagibis in 2019 which caused further damage to the railway, the operator Sanriku Railway Co,.Ltd. have received around ￥40 million in donations to help with repairs.

See also
List of railway companies in Japan

References
This article incorporates material from the corresponding article in the Japanese Wikipedia.

External links 

  in English
  

Railway companies of Japan
Rail transport in Iwate Prefecture
Railway companies established in 1981
Companies based in Iwate Prefecture
Japanese third-sector railway lines